The South Brooklyn Marine Terminal (SBMT) is an intermodal shipping, warehousing, and manufacturing complex in the Port of New York and New Jersey. It is located along the Upper New York Bay, between 29th and 39th Streets in the Sunset Park and Greenwood Heights neighborhoods of Brooklyn, New York City. The site is adjacent to Bush Terminal and Industry City, which respectively lie directly to the south and east. A recycling and waste transfer facility managed by Sims Metal Management is the major tenant. In May 2018, the city contracted partners to activate the largely unused terminal.

Early ferry service

The New York and South Brooklyn Ferry operated a ferry from the Battery Maritime Building (formerly known as Municipal Ferry Pier) to the South Brooklyn/39th Street Ferry Terminal, where rail transfer (to the South Brooklyn Railway) was possible until 1935.

Formerly, a Staten Island Ferry route ran between the ferry slip at 39th Street within Bush Terminal, and the St. George Terminal in Staten Island. The ferry route was discontinued in 1946 after a fire at St. George Terminal.

Rail service

Adjacent to the Bush Terminal it is served by car float and transloading activities of New York New Jersey Rail via the 65th Street Yard which also connects to the Bay Ridge Branch, operated by the New York Connecting Railroad. Rail infrastructure improvements along 1st Avenue completed in 2012 connected the yard to SBMT. Other investments in infrastructure included a new break-bulk rail spur along the 39th Street shed, two new rail sidings for auto rack transloading, and a new rail connection to the SIMS facility at the 29th Street Pier. SBMT is also connected along the  South Brooklyn Railway (ROW) to 36th–38th Street Yard. In 2012, the interchange with New York New Jersey Rail, LLC at Second Avenue was refurbished and a new ramp was installed at the 38th Street Yard  at Fourth Avenue to allow receipt of new R156 locomotives and other subway rolling stock that are delivered on flat cars.

Waste management

Sims Metal Management subsidiary Sims Municipal Recycling (SMR) managed construction of a new 11-acre recycling center at SBMT from 2010 to 2013. SMR worked with geotechnical engineers to develop structural fill blends using “mole rock” from NYC tunneling projects mixed with recycled glass aggregate (RGA). More than 5,000 tons of RGA were blended with 20,000 tons of mole rock and used to elevate sections of the site by 4 feet, thereby protecting buildings and equipment against sea level rise and storm surges.

Wind turbines
 In January 2015, SIMS inaugurated the city's only commercial-scale wind turbine at the recycling center.

In January 2021, NY Governor Andrew Cuomo announced that the site would be developed to include a wind turbine assembly plant to be partially funded by New York State. Turbines manufactured there will be used in constructing three offshore wind farms off the east end of Long Island. South Fork Wind Farm, Beacon Wind and Sunrise Wind are projected to be supplied by 2025 from the new plant, built with $200 million in state funding and $200 million in matching grants. Part of a $29 billion 'Green Initiative' plan for NYS. The project is expected to create 1,200 new manufacturing jobs in Sunset Park.

Auto processing
Auto processing, the customization of imported automobiles, is done at the terminal at a scaled-down assembly plant where much of the work is done by hand using simple tools. Quality control inspections are done, repairs are made, and accessories – such as floor mats, GPS systems, satellite radios, alloy wheels and roof racks – are installed. The facility at SBMT was operated by the Axis Group. which filed bankruptcy in 2012. Plans by the New York City Economic Development Corporation (NYCEDC) to redevelop and expand the auto processing have been bogged down since 2014.

Sustainable South Brooklyn Marine Terminal
The SBMT was designated as part of America's Marine Highway in 2015. In 2018, Sustainable South Brooklyn Marine Terminal
(SSBMT) was established and operations turned over the Red Hook Container Terminal operators.

35th Street pier fire (1956)
On December 3, 1956, the area was the site of one of the largest explosions in New York City history.  A fire on the Luckenbach Pier at the end of 35th St reached 37,000 pounds of highly explosive Primacord, resulting in an explosion that killed 10 people and injured 247.

See also

 List of North American ports
 List of ports in the United States
 Red Hook Container Terminal
 Rail freight transportation in New York City and Long Island
 Tugboats in New York City
 Vision 2020: New York City Comprehensive Waterfront Plan

References 

Transportation buildings and structures in Brooklyn
Ports and harbors of New York (state)
Railway freight terminals in the United States
Sunset Park, Brooklyn
Port of New York and New Jersey
Wind power in New York (state)